X-Men: The Last Stand – Original Motion Picture Soundtrack was composed by John Powell and released on May 23, 2006 by Varèse Sarabande and Fox Music. X-Men: The Last Stand was the third film in the series, and Powell was the third composer used following Michael Kamen and John Ottman.

X-Men: The Last Stand – Original Motion Picture Soundtrack has received generally positive reviews.

Style
The film's director Brett Ratner invited John Powell to write the music for being a fan of Powell's work in The Bourne Identity. Powell included references to the score from the previous two films - "it all had to be in the same family, and the same language" - and used lyrics from Benjamin Britten's Requiem Mass for the choir parts.

Powell deviated from the first two in that he created less a set of individual cues and more of a cohesive sound throughout. Most of the 27 tracks are short, with the exception of a few extended battle sequence cues. The second track "Bathroom Titles" is an explosion of violent percussion in the form of Danny Elfman's Planet of the Apes soundtrack. Actually, Powell's style is a noticeable mixture of Elfman and John Williams (especially their Spider-Man and Superman soundtracks, respectively).

Orchestration
Powell had a 141 musicians of the Hollywood Studio Symphony at his disposal, and he did not waste them. Despite drawing similarities to other composers (like Danny Elfman and John Williams), soundtrack reviewer and talk show host Clark Douglas stated that Powell diverted from "recent action scores which force the orchestra to play second string to the synthetic elements (such as Klaus Badelt's "Poseidon")... [and instead] fully utilizes the elements at his disposal." Douglas went on to say that the orchestra is best used during the "final third" of the score.

Track listing

On the CD version of the album, the track "Phoenix Rises" is incorrectly labeled on the back and inside the booklet as having a length of 6:29 when, in fact, it is only 4:21.

Chart positions

References

2006 soundtrack albums
2000s film soundtrack albums
Marvel Comics film soundtracks
X-Men (film series)
Varèse Sarabande soundtracks
John Powell (film composer) soundtracks